Warren Truck Assembly is a Stellantis automobile factory in Warren, Michigan.  The factory opened in 1938 and was known as "Dodge City" until the mid-2000's.  The nearby Warren Stamping opened in 1949 and just south of Eight Mile Road in Detroit, the Mound Road Engine plant opened in 1953.  There also was once the nearby Sherwood Assembly that closed in the late 1970s when Chrysler halted production of the Dodge Medium and Heavy Duty trucks and exited the market. It was located on the southwest corner of 9 Mile Road and Sherwood, adjacent to the Warren Assembly site on the east.

The facility was the site of Dodge Dakota production from 1987 through 2011, with over 2.75 million vehicles produced.

The Warren Truck plant became the sole source of Ram 1500 Rebel production in 2015.

The factory received a US$1 billion investment to upgrade and convert the facility to production of a revived Jeep Wagoneer, which was completed in 2020. In 2018, Fiat Chrysler said that it would move production of its Ram Heavy Duty trucks from Mexico to Warren. However, in 2021, Chrysler's new owner, Stellantis, announced that Heavy Duty trucks will continue to be produced in Mexico.

Products
Ram 1500 Classic
Jeep Wagoneer (2021)
Jeep Grand Wagoneer (2021)

Past
Dodge A-Series
Dodge B-Series Pickup
Dodge B-Series Van
Dodge C-Series Pickup
Dodge D-Series Pickup 
Dodge M Series motorhome chassis 
Dodge W-Series Pickup incl. Power Wagon 
Dodge Ramcharger through 1985 
Plymouth Trailduster 
Dodge Dakota
Dodge Ram
Dodge T-, V-, W-Series (1939–1947; civilian / commercial)
Dodge M37
Dodge VC, WC, VF and WF series (1940–1945; military)
Mitsubishi Raider
Ram Dakota

See also
List of Chrysler factories
Ram Trucks

References

External links
Ram Trucks official site

Chrysler factories
Motor vehicle assembly plants in Michigan
Buildings and structures in Macomb County, Michigan
1938 establishments in Michigan
Warren, Michigan